The 2020–21 network television schedule for the five major English-language commercial broadcast networks in the United States covers the prime time hours from September 2020 to August 2021. The schedule is followed by a list per network of returning series, new series, and series canceled after the 2019–20 television season.

Fox was the first to announce its fall schedule on May 11, 2020, followed by The CW on May 14, CBS on May 19, NBC on June 16, and ABC on June 17, 2020.

PBS is not included at all, as member television stations have local flexibility over most of their schedules and broadcast times for network shows may vary. Ion Television and MyNetworkTV are also not included because both network schedules comprise syndicated reruns. This is the last season that The CW did not program primetime on Saturday evenings (however it does offer network programming on Saturdays in the following season) .

New series are highlighted in bold.

All times are U.S. Eastern and Pacific Time (except for some live sports or events). Subtract one hour for Central, Mountain, Alaska, and Hawaii-Aleutian times.

Each of the 30 highest-rated shows is listed with its rank and rating as determined by Nielsen Media Research.

Impact of the COVID-19 pandemic

Each of the major television networks in the United States had initially planned for their upfront presentations to be made to the public in mid-May, a tradition going back to the Golden Age of Television. Due to concerns caused by COVID-19, most major networks and cable network groups canceled their public upfront events due to both public health concerns, and stay-at-home orders which effectively prevented them from going forward. It was expected most of the upfront announcements would be either press releases or virtual video events via videotelephony, and could be delayed due to pilots being unable to be produced, along with an overall decline in advertising. NBC carried traditional upfront content on July 16, 2020, blended in as a part of 30 Rock: A One-Time Special, though a majority of the network's affiliates pre-empted the event (it aired the next day as a special airing across all of NBCUniversal's cable networks at the same time in primetime).

On May 1, the Television Critics Association cancelled its summer 2020 press tour, originally scheduled for July 28 through August 13 (during the now-rescheduled 2020 Summer Olympics), as the organization was unsure it could occur at all due to public gathering restrictions and an anticipated lack of any scripted programming output, even in pilot form, to promote by that time period. The TCA cancellation complicated any plans by the networks to build buzz about their upcoming schedules, while the move of the 2020 Summer Olympics to 2021 nullified any plans NBC had to use the Games to lead into their new television season.

Delays in production as a result of the pandemic resulted in many shows being pushed over from their intended Summer 2020 premieres. CBS was the first network to push the thirty-second season premiere of The Amazing Race as a part of its contingency plan to preserve programming for fall. The same day, ABC announced that it had delayed the sixteenth season of its summer staple series The Bachelorette to a tentative fall launch, while sister-series Bachelor in Paradise had been postponed indefinitely. The following month, Fox and The CW followed suit by announcing that both the networks would be delaying most of their original scripted premieres to a cycle beginning in January 2021, and their fall lineup would consist primarily of acquisitions and delayed summer series.

In light of further delays in production, CBS moved up S.W.A.T. to a fall premiere to replace Survivor, while the latter had been postponed its production of the forty-first season to spring 2021 and was replaced by aforementioned The Amazing Race. On August 26, 2020, the network further modified its schedule by deciding to push the premieres of all scripted programming to November and air acquired and encore programming in Early fall instead. Similarly, NBC altered its schedule on August 12, 2020, by replacing The Voice with American Ninja Warrior on Monday nights.

On September 16, 2020, ABC announced that the network would not be moving forward with the second season of Stumptown, a decision that came in reversal to its May 2020 renewal. COVID-related production delays that would not have allowed the series to be ready for telecast before April 2021 (the end of the broadcast season) were cited as the primary reason behind the cancellation.

Because of the pandemic-related production halts, this is the third time in the history of American television where the start of the television season was delayed due to issues outside of the control of the major television networks; the last two instances occurred in the 1988–89 season (which was delayed due to the 1988 Writers Guild of America strike) and the 2001–02 season (which was affected by news coverage of the terrorist attacks on September 11, 2001).

In spite of the fact that an effective vaccine for the COVID-19 virus was not available until the first few months of 2021, most scripted shows were able to resume production in the autumn of 2020. This was accomplished by having all cast and crew members take daily COVID-19 tests during production to ensure no transmission of the virus, not having fans in the audience during tapings, and often writing scenes to reduce the total number of people on set at a given time. The 2020-21 season saw a diffused approach to COVID-19; some series acknowledged the pandemic and had storylines that addressed the issues from it, while others did not reference it at all. Chuck Lorre said publicly that his CBS shows would not take place in a setting where COVID-19 existed, something that he's stuck with going into 2023.

Legend

Sunday

Monday

Tuesday

Wednesday

Thursday

Friday

Saturday

By network

Note: Series that were originally intended to air in 2019–20 but were delayed due to the COVID-19 pandemic are indicated using .

ABC

Returning series:
20/20
The $100,000 Pyramid
American Housewife
American Idol
America's Funniest Home Videos
The Bachelor
Bachelor in Paradise
The Bachelorette
Black-ish
Card Sharks
Celebrity Family Feud
The Chase
The Conners
Dancing with the Stars
For Life
The Goldbergs
The Good Doctor
The Great Christmas Light Fight
Grey's Anatomy
Holey Moley
Match Game
A Million Little Things
Mixed-ish
Press Your Luck
The Rookie
Saturday Night Football
Shark Tank
Station 19
Supermarket Sweep
To Tell the Truth
Who Wants to Be a Millionaire
The Wonderful World of Disney

New series:
Big Sky
Call Your Mother
The Celebrity Dating Game
Celebrity Wheel of Fortune
The Con
Emergency Call
Home Economics
The Hustler
Mike Tyson: The Knockout
Pooch Perfect
Rebel
Soul of a Nation
Superstar
The Ultimate Surfer
When Nature Calls with Helen Mirren

Not returning from 2019–20:
Agents of S.H.I.E.L.D.
The Bachelor Presents: Listen to Your Heart
The Bachelor: The Greatest Seasons - Ever!
The Baker and the Beauty
Bless This Mess
Don't
Emergence
Fresh Off the Boat
The Genetic Detective
The Great American Baking Show
How to Get Away with Murder
Kids Say the Darndest Things (moved to CBS)
The Last Dance
Modern Family
Schooled
Single Parents
Stumptown
United We Fall
What Would You Do?

CBS

Returning series:
48 Hours
60 Minutes
All Rise
The Amazing Race
Big Brother
Blue Bloods
Bob Hearts Abishola
Bull
CBS Sunday Night Movies
FBI
FBI: Most Wanted
The Greatest #AtHome Videos
Kids Say the Darndest Things (moved from ABC)
Love Island
MacGyver
Magnum P.I.
Mom
NCIS
NCIS: Los Angeles
NCIS: New Orleans
The Neighborhood
One Day at a Time (moved from Netflix)
SEAL Team
S.W.A.T.
Tough as Nails
Undercover Boss
The Unicorn
Young Sheldon

New series:
48 Hours: Suspicion
B Positive
Clarice
The Equalizer
The FBI Declassified
House Calls with Dr. Phil
Manhunt: Deadly Games
Secret Celebrity Renovation
Star Trek: Discovery
Superstar Racing Experience
United States of Al

Not returning from 2019–20:
Broke
Carol's Second Act
Criminal Minds
Evil (moved to Paramount+)
Game On!
God Friended Me
Hawaii Five-0
Madam Secretary
Man with a Plan
Survivor (returned for 2021–22)
Tommy

The CW

Returning series:
All American
Batwoman
Black Lightning
Bulletproof
Burden of Truth
Charmed
The Christmas Caroler Challenge
Coroner
Dead Pixels
Dynasty
The Flash
In the Dark
Legacies
Legends of Tomorrow
Masters of Illusion
Nancy Drew
The Outpost
Pandora
Penn & Teller: Fool Us
Riverdale
Roswell, New Mexico
Stargirl
Supergirl
Supernatural
Tell Me a Story
Two Sentence Horror Stories
Whose Line Is It Anyway?

New series:

Devils
Gilmore Girls: A Year in the Life
Kung Fu
The Republic of Sarah
Superman & Lois
Swamp Thing
Trickster
Walker
Wellington Paranormal (shared with HBO Max)
World's Funniest Animals

Not returning from 2019–20:
The 100
Arrow
Being Reuben
Fridge Wars
Katy Keene
Killer Camp (returned for 2021–22)
Mysteries Decoded (returning for 2021–22)
Taskmaster

Fox

Returning series:
9-1-1
9-1-1: Lone Star
America's Most Wanted
Baseball Night in America
Beat Shazam
Bless the Harts
Bob's Burgers
Duncanville
Family Guy
Fox College Football
Fox PBC Fight Night
Hell's Kitchen
Last Man Standing
Lego Masters
The Masked Singer
MasterChef
Mental Samurai
The Moodys
Name That Tune
NFL on Fox
Prodigal Son
The Resident
The Simpsons
Thursday Night Football
 WWE SmackDown

New series:
Call Me Kat
Cherries Wild
Cosmos: Possible Worlds
Crime Scene Kitchen
Fantasy Island
Filthy Rich
Game of Talents
The Great North
Holmes Family Effect
HouseBroken
I Can See Your Voice
L.A.'s Finest
Let's Be Real
The Masked Dancer
Next

Not returning from 2019–20:
Almost Family
Celebrity Watch Party
Deputy
Empire
Flirty Dancing
Fox Presents 
Gordon Ramsay's 24 Hours to Hell and Back
Labor of Love
The Masked Singer: After the Mask
Outmatched
Ultimate Tag

NBC

Returning series:
American Ninja Warrior
America's Got Talent
The Blacklist
Brooklyn Nine-Nine
Capital One College Bowl
Chicago Fire
Chicago Med
Chicago P.D.
Dateline NBC
Ellen's Game of Games
Football Night in America
Good Girls
Law & Order: Special Victims Unit
Making It
Manifest
NBC Sunday Night Football
New Amsterdam
NHL on NBC
Superstore
This Is Us
The Voice
The Wall
Weakest Link
Zoey's Extraordinary Playlist

New series:
Connecting
Debris
Family Game Fight!
Kenan
Law & Order: Organized Crime
Mr. Mayor
Nurses
Small Fortune
Transplant
Young Rock

Not returning from 2019–20:
America's Got Talent: The Champions
Blindspot
Bluff City Law
Council of Dads
Ellen's Greatest Night of Giveaways
The Good Place
Hollywood Game Night
Indebted
Lincoln Rhyme: Hunt for the Bone Collector
Little Big Shots
NBC Movie Night
Perfect Harmony
Songland
Sunnyside
The Titan Games
Will & Grace
World of Dance

Renewals and cancellations

Full season pickups

ABC
Big Sky—Picked up for six additional episodes on December 7, 2020, bringing the episode count to 16.
Black-ish—Picked up for six additional episodes on October 23, 2020, bringing the episode count to 21.

CBS
B Positive—Picked up for five additional episodes on December 21, 2020, bringing the episode count to 18.

The CW
The Outpost—Picked up for 13 additional episodes on October 7, 2020, bringing the episode count to 26.
Superman & Lois—Picked up for two additional episodes on February 3, 2021, bringing the episode count to 15.
Walker—Picked up for five additional episodes on February 3, 2021, bringing the episode count to 18.

Fox
Let's Be Real—Picked up for four additional episodes on April 1, 2021, bringing the episode count to 5.

NBC

Renewals

ABC
20/20—Renewed for a forty-fourth season on May 18, 2021.
The $100,000 Pyramid—Renewed for a sixth season on April 1, 2022.
American Idol—Renewed for a twentieth season on May 13, 2021.
America's Funniest Home Videos—Renewed for a thirty-second season on May 13, 2021.
The Bachelor—Renewed for a twenty-sixth season on September 28, 2021.
Bachelor in Paradise—Renewed for an eighth season on April 7, 2022.
The Bachelorette—Renewed for an eighteenth season on March 15, 2021.
Big Sky—Renewed for a second season on May 4, 2021.
Black-ish—Renewed for an eighth and final season on May 14, 2021.
Celebrity Family Feud—Renewed for a ninth season on April 1, 2022.
Celebrity Wheel of Fortune—Renewed for a second season on May 13, 2021.
The Con—Renewed for a second season on July 25, 2022.
The Conners—Renewed for a fourth season on May 14, 2021.
Dancing with the Stars—Renewed for a thirtieth season on March 30, 2021.
The Goldbergs—Renewed for a ninth season on May 14, 2021.
The Good Doctor—Renewed for a fifth season on May 3, 2021.
The Great Christmas Light Fight—Renewed for a ninth season on December 10, 2020.
Grey's Anatomy—Renewed for an eighteenth season on May 10, 2021.
Holey Moley—Renewed for a fourth season on February 22, 2021.
Home Economics—Renewed for a second season on May 14, 2021.
A Million Little Things—Renewed for a fourth season on May 14, 2021.
Monday Night Football–Renewed for a second season on March 18, 2021; deal will last into a thirteenth season in 2033.
NHL on ABC—It was announced on March 10, 2021, that ABC's sister network ESPN regained the rights to air National Hockey League games (including 25 games slated to air on ESPN and ABC) for seven years through the 2027–28 season.
Press Your Luck—Renewed for a fourth season on April 1, 2022.
The Rookie—Renewed for a fourth season on May 14, 2021.
Shark Tank—Renewed for a thirteenth season on May 13, 2021.
Station 19—Renewed for a fifth season on May 10, 2021.
Supermarket Sweep—Renewed for a ninth season on May 13, 2021.

CBS
48 Hours—Renewed for a thirty-fourth season on May 19, 2021.
60 Minutes—Renewed for a fifty-fourth season on May 19, 2021.
The Amazing Race—Renewed for a thirty-third season on February 25, 2020.
B Positive—Renewed for a second season on May 15, 2021.
Big Brother—Renewed for a twenty-fourth season on May 31, 2022.
Blue Bloods—Renewed for a twelfth season on April 15, 2021.
Bob Hearts Abishola—Renewed for a third season on February 17, 2021.
Bull—Renewed for a sixth and final season on April 15, 2021.
The Equalizer—Renewed for a second season on March 9, 2021.
FBI—Renewed for a fourth season on March 24, 2021.
FBI: Most Wanted—Renewed for a third season on March 24, 2021.
Love Island—Renewed for a fourth and fifth season on February 23, 2022, and will be moved to Peacock.
Magnum P.I.—Renewed for a fourth season on April 15, 2021.
NCIS—Renewed for a nineteenth season on April 15, 2021.
NCIS: Los Angeles—Renewed for a thirteenth season on April 23, 2021.
The Neighborhood—Renewed for a fourth season on February 17, 2021.
SEAL Team—Renewed for a fifth season on May 18, 2021, which will air its first four episodes on CBS, before moving to Paramount+ for the remainder of its run.
Secret Celebrity Renovation—Renewed for a second season on March 9, 2022.
Superstar Racing Experience—Renewed for a second season on January 31, 2022.
S.W.A.T.—Renewed for a fifth season on April 15, 2021.
Undercover Boss—Renewed for an eleventh season on May 19, 2021.
United States of Al—Renewed for a second season on May 15, 2021.
Tough as Nails—Renewed for a third and fourth season on April 14, 2021.
Young Sheldon—Renewed for a fifth, sixth and seventh season on March 30, 2021.

The CW
All American—Renewed for a fourth season on February 3, 2021.
Batwoman—Renewed for a third season on February 3, 2021.
Charmed—Renewed for a fourth season on February 3, 2021.
Coroner—Renewed for a fourth season on April 7, 2022.
Devils—Renewed for a second season on April 7, 2022.
Dynasty—Renewed for a fifth season on February 3, 2021.
The Flash—Renewed for an eighth season on February 3, 2021.
In the Dark—Renewed for a fourth season on February 3, 2021.
Kung Fu—Renewed for a second season on May 3, 2021.
Legacies—Renewed for a fourth season on February 3, 2021.
Legends of Tomorrow—Renewed for a seventh season on February 3, 2021.
Nancy Drew—Renewed for a third season on February 3, 2021.
Penn & Teller: Fool Us—Renewed for a ninth season on December 7, 2020.
Riverdale—Renewed for a sixth season on February 3, 2021.
Roswell, New Mexico—Renewed for a fourth season on February 3, 2021.
Stargirl—Renewed for a third and final season on May 3, 2021.
Superman & Lois—Renewed for a second season on March 2, 2021.
Two Sentence Horror Stories—Renewed for a third season on September 17, 2020.
Walker—Renewed for a second season on February 3, 2021.
Wellington Paranormal—Renewed for a third season on April 7, 2022.
World's Funniest Animals—Renewed for a second season on December 7, 2020.

Fox
9-1-1—Renewed for a fifth season on May 17, 2021.
9-1-1: Lone Star—Renewed for a third season on May 17, 2021.
Beat Shazam—Renewed for a fifth season on April 5, 2022.
Bob's Burgers—Renewed for a twelfth and thirteenth season on September 23, 2020.
Call Me Kat—Renewed for a second season on May 10, 2021.
Crime Scene Kitchen—Renewed for a second season on May 16, 2022.
Duncanville—Renewed for a third season on April 6, 2021.
Family Guy—Renewed for a twentieth and twenty-first season on September 23, 2020.
Fantasy Island—Renewed for a second season on November 4, 2021.
The Great North—Renewed for a second season on June 22, 2020.
Hell's Kitchen—Renewed for a twenty-first and twenty-second season on February 1, 2022.
HouseBroken—Renewed for a second season on August 9, 2021.
I Can See Your Voice—Renewed for a second season on January 27, 2021.
Lego Masters—Renewed for a third season on December 3, 2021.
The Masked Singer—Renewed for a sixth season on May 17, 2021.
MasterChef—Renewed for a twelfth season on August 18, 2021.
Name That Tune—Renewed for a second season on October 25, 2021.
The Resident—Renewed for a fifth season on May 17, 2021.
The Simpsons—Renewed for a thirty-third and thirty-fourth season on March 3, 2021.
Thursday Night Football—Renewed for an eighth season on January 31, 2018.

NBC
American Ninja Warrior—Renewed for a thirteenth season on March 31, 2022.
America's Got Talent—Renewed for a sixteenth season on March 31, 2022.
The Blacklist—Renewed for a ninth season on January 26, 2021.
Capital One College Bowl—Renewed for a second season on April 28, 2022.
Chicago Fire—Renewed for a tenth and eleventh season on February 27, 2020.
Chicago Med—Renewed for a seventh and eighth season on February 27, 2020.
Chicago P.D.—Renewed for a ninth and tenth season on February 27, 2020.
Dateline NBC—Renewed for a thirtieth season on May 14, 2021.
Football Night in America—Renewed for a sixteenth season on December 14, 2011; deal will go to a seventeenth season in 2022.
Kenan—Renewed for a second season on April 30, 2021.
Law & Order: Organized Crime—Renewed for a second season on May 14, 2021.
Law & Order: Special Victims Unit—Renewed for a twenty-third and twenty-fourth season on February 27, 2020.
Mr. Mayor—Renewed for a second season on March 22, 2021.
NBC Sunday Night Football—Renewed for a sixteenth season on December 14, 2011; deal will go to a seventeenth season in 2022.
New Amsterdam—Renewed for a fourth and fifth season on January 11, 2020.
This Is Us—Renewed for a sixth and final season on May 12, 2019.
Transplant—Renewed for a second season on December 11, 2020.
The Voice—Renewed for a twenty-first season on March 30, 2021.
Weakest Link—Renewed for a sixth season on January 25, 2021.
Young Rock—Renewed for a second season on April 30, 2021.

Cancellations/series endings

ABC
American Housewife—Canceled on May 14, 2021, after five seasons.
Call Your Mother—Canceled on May 14, 2021. The series concluded on May 19, 2021.
Card Sharks—Canceled on April 1, 2022, after two seasons.
The Celebrity Dating Game—Canceled on April 1, 2022.
For Life—Canceled on May 14, 2021, after two seasons.
The Hustler—Canceled on April 1, 2022, after two seasons.
Match Game—Canceled on April 1, 2022, after five seasons.
Mike Tyson: The Knockout—The documentary miniseries was meant to run for one season only; it concluded on June 1, 2021.
Mixed-ish—Canceled on May 14, 2021, after two seasons. The series concluded on May 18, 2021.
Pooch Perfect—Canceled on January 20, 2022.
Rebel—Canceled on May 14, 2021. The series concluded on June 10, 2021.
Soul of a Nation—The documentary miniseries was meant to run for one season only; it concluded on April 6, 2021.
The Ultimate Surfer—Canceled on March 30, 2022.

CBS
All Rise—Canceled on May 15, 2021, after two seasons. On September 29, 2021, it was announced that Oprah Winfrey Network would pick up the series for another season.
Clarice—It was announced on June 10, 2021, that a possible move to Paramount+ became unlikely to happen, rendering it as a de facto cancellation. The series concluded on June 24, 2021.
MacGyver—It was announced on April 7, 2021, that season five would be the final season. The series concluded on April 30, 2021.
Manhunt: Deadly Games—The anthology series was meant to run for one season only; it concluded on November 7, 2020.
Mom—It was announced on February 17, 2021, that season eight would be the final season. The series concluded on May 13, 2021.
NCIS: New Orleans—It was announced on February 17, 2021, that season seven would be the final season. The series concluded on May 23, 2021. 
One Day at a Time—Canceled on November 24, 2020, by creator Pop, after four seasons.
Star Trek: Discovery—The broadcast television run was meant for one season only; it concluded on February 4, 2021.
The Unicorn—Canceled on May 15, 2021, after two seasons.

The CW
Black Lightning—It was announced on November 20, 2020, that season four would be the final season. The series concluded on May 24, 2021.
Bulletproof—Canceled on May 21, 2021, by creator Sky One, after three seasons. 
Burden of Truth—It was announced on March 18, 2021, that season four would be the final season. The series concluded on September 17, 2021.
Gilmore Girls: A Year in the Life—The miniseries was meant to run for one season only by creator Netflix, the miniseries was air a four-night event beginning from November 23 through November 26, 2020.
The Outpost—Canceled on September 15, 2021, after four seasons. The series concluded on October 7, 2021.
Pandora—Canceled on May 17, 2021, after two seasons.
The Republic of Sarah—Canceled on September 2, 2021. The series concluded on September 6, 2021.
Supergirl—It was announced on September 22, 2020, that season six would be the final season. The series concluded on November 9, 2021.
Supernatural—It was announced on March 22, 2019, that season fifteen would be the final season. The series concluded on November 19, 2020.
Swamp Thing—Canceled on June 6, 2019, by creator DC Universe. The series concluded on December 22, 2020.
Tell Me a Story—Canceled on May 11, 2020, by creator CBS All Access, after two seasons. The series concluded on December 29, 2020.
Trickster—Canceled on January 29, 2021, by creator CBC. The series concluded on February 16, 2021.

Fox
Bless the Harts—Canceled on April 1, 2021, after two seasons. The series concluded on June 20, 2021.
Cosmos: Possible Worlds—The documentary miniseries was meant to run for one season only; it concluded on December 21, 2020.
Filthy Rich—Canceled on October 30, 2020, marking the first cancellation of the season. The series concluded on November 30, 2020.
Holmes Family Effect—The documentary miniseries was meant to run for one season only; it concluded on March 23, 2021.
L.A.'s Finest—Canceled on October 14, 2020, by creator Charter Spectrum, after two seasons.
Last Man Standing—It was announced on October 14, 2020, that season nine would be the final season. The series concluded on May 20, 2021.
The Moodys—Pulled from the schedule after five episodes in the second season on April 16, 2021; Fox announced that the series would move from Thursdays to a burn off run of three episodes on Sundays. The series was later canceled on June 17, 2021, after two seasons. The series concluded on June 20, 2021.
Next—Canceled on October 30, 2020, marking the first cancellation of the season. The series concluded on December 22, 2020.
Prodigal Son—Canceled on May 10, 2021, after two seasons. The series concluded on May 18, 2021.

NBC
Brooklyn Nine-Nine—It was announced on February 11, 2021, that season eight would be the final season. The series concluded on September 16, 2021.
Connecting—Canceled on November 2, 2020. The remaining unaired episodes were made available on NBC's website and Peacock. The series concluded on November 16, 2020.
Debris—Canceled on May 27, 2021.
Ellen's Game of Games—Canceled on January 18, 2022, after four seasons.
Good Girls—Canceled on June 25, 2021, after four seasons. The series concluded on July 22, 2021.
Manifest—Canceled on June 14, 2021, after three seasons. On August 28, 2021, it was announced that Netflix would pick up the series for another season.
NHL on NBC—It was announced on April 26, 2021, that NBC had backed out of negotiations for the partial contractual rights of the remainder of the National Hockey League games (including the New Year's Day Winter Classic) and awarded the rights to Turner Sports beginning with the 2021–22 season and lasted through 2027–28 season.
Small Fortune—Canceled on January 20, 2022.
Superstore—It was announced on December 3, 2020, that season six would be the final season. The series concluded on March 25, 2021.
Ultimate Slip 'N Slide—It was announced on August 6, 2021, that the series would not be airing.
Zoey's Extraordinary Playlist—Canceled on June 9, 2021, after two seasons.

See also
2020–21 Canadian network television schedule
2020–21 United States network television schedule (daytime)
2020–21 United States network television schedule (late night)
2020–21 United States network television schedule (overnight)

Notes

References

United States primetime network television schedules
2020 in American television
2021 in American television